Marc Solà Pastoret  (born 6 September 1985) is a Catalan ski mountaineer.

Solá is born in Camprodon. He started ski mountaineering in 2002 and has been member of the Spanish national team since 2003. He lives in Vilallonga de Ter.

Selected results 
 2005:
 3rd, at the last World Cup race, Slovakia
 4th, World Cup race, "junior" class, 2005
 2007:
 4th, European Championship relay race together with Javier Martín de Villa, Agustí Roc Amador and Manuel Pérez Brunicardi
 2008:
 3rd, World Championship relay race together with Javier Martín de Villa, Manuel Pérez Brunicardi and Kílian Jornet Burgada
 9th, World Championship single race
 9th, World Championship long distance race
 2011:
 9th, World Championship team race (together with Miguel Caballero Ortega)
 2012:
 4th, European Championship relay, together with Marc Pinsach Rubirola, Miguel Caballero Ortega and Kílian Jornet Burgada
 8th, European Championship team, together with Miguel Caballero Ortega
 10th, European Championship vertical race

Pierra Menta 

 2007: 10th,  together with Jordi Bes Ginesta

Patrouille des Glaciers 

 2010: 4th, together with Kílian Jornet Burgada and Marc Pinsach Rubirola

External links 
 Marc Solà Pastoret at Skimountaineering.org

References 

1985 births
Living people
Spanish male ski mountaineers
Spanish sky runners
Ski mountaineers from Catalonia
People from Ripollès
Sportspeople from the Province of Girona